"Hush Boy" is a song by English electronic music duo Basement Jaxx. It was released in 2006 by record label XL as the first single from their fourth studio album Crazy Itch Radio. It reached number 27 on the UK Singles Chart.

Composition
With the song "Oh My Gosh", the duo sat down and wrote it specially as a single for the album. Ratcliffe personally felt encouraged by it, he thought it was a good way to ease them back into songwriting process and applied the treatment to make "Hush Boy". However, they failed, and made the process even more difficult.

Music video
Scott Lapatine from Stereogum stated: "Sorry for all the YouTubing today. Well, actually we're not that sorry seeing as how BJaxx never let us down."

http://drownedinsound.com/releases/8014/reviews/1099798-

Track listings and formats
UK CD single
 "Hush Boy"
 "Trouble"

UK 12" single #1
 "Hush Boy"
 "Hush Salsa"
 "Trouble" 	

UK 12" single #2
 "Hush Boy" (Soul Seekerz Remix)
 "Hush Boy" (Les Visiteurs Remix)
 "Hush Boy" (Les Visiteurs Dub)

Charts

References 

2006 singles
2006 songs
Basement Jaxx songs
XL Recordings singles
Songs written by Felix Buxton
Songs written by Simon Ratcliffe (musician)